Glochinomyia is a genus of flies in the family Stratiomyidae. Its only species is Glochinomyia albiseta. It is found in Papua New Guinea.

References

Stratiomyidae
Brachycera genera
Taxa named by Kálmán Kertész
Diptera of Australasia
Endemic fauna of Papua New Guinea
Taxa described in 1916
Monotypic Diptera genera